Sinéad Millea (born in Kilkenny) is a former camogie player for Kilkenny, winner of an All-Star award in 2004 and two All Ireland medals. She was honoured by inclusion in the University of Limericks' Sports Hall of Fame in 2013.

Family background
Her father Joe was a member of the Kilkenny team that won the Liam MacCarthy Cup in 1969. Sinéad went to school at St Brigid's in Callan. Her sister is Tracey Millea.

Career
She played club camogie in Tipperary and Kilkenny, won three All-Ireland Minor titles with Kilkenny and helped her county to the Senior title in 1991 and 1994. She played on the University of Limerick team that won their first Ashbourne Cup in 1995.

Notable sporting achievements include; 2 Senior All-Irelands, 2 National Leagues, 3 Minor All-Irelands, 1 Junior Colleges All-Ireland, 1 Senior Colleges All-Ireland, 1 Ashbourne Cup medal, 1 Ashbourne Shield medal, 7 Leinster Senior Championships, County Championship medals at all levels.

Honours

 All Ireland Senior Camogie Championship (2)
 1991, 1994
 National Camogie League (2)
 1993, 2008
 All-Ireland Minor Camogie Championship (3)
 1988, 1989, 1991
 All Ireland Colleges Camogie Championship (2)
 Junior 1990
 Senior 1993
 Ashbourne Cup (1)
 1995
 Leinster Senior Camogie Championship (7)

See also 

 Camogie All Stars Awards
 All-Ireland Senior Camogie Championship
 National Camogie League
 Ashbourne Cup
 Wikipedia List of Camogie players

References

External links
 
 
 

Living people
Kilkenny camogie players
Year of birth missing (living people)
UL GAA camogie players